The East Clubbers were a dance group from Poland, composed of Piotr Kwiatkowski (DJ Silver) and Piotr Wachnicki (DJ Sqren). The duo also worked with another Polish producer, Janardana. East Clubbers has many international hits, particularly in Europe, such as "Walk Alone", "Beat is Coming" and "Crazy Right Now".

History
The members of the East Clubbers have worked over eight years in the dance music field. They have previously been involved in other projects, such as Clubringer, DPM, Trinity and Janardana. The group has been together since 2002.

Career

The group co-operates with Kate Lesing, who sings most of their songs. East Clubbers aim to popularize Polish dance music internationally. The duo's first album, E-Quality, was released in 2004. Their second album, Never Enough, includes singles such as My Love, Make Me Live and Sextasy which were popular in Poland. The majority of the tracks have a progressive house and dance sound to them. They have also made several songs for Norwegian Russ-busses.

Discography

References
Discogs.com

Eurodance groups
Polish electronic music groups
Musical groups established in 2002